Socket M (mPGA478MT) is a CPU interface introduced by Intel in 2006 for the Intel Core line of mobile processors.

Technical specifications
Socket M is used in all Intel Core products, as well as the Core-derived Dual-Core Xeon codenamed Sossaman. It was also used in the first generation of the mobile version of Intel's Core 2 Duo, specifically, the T5x00 and T7x00 Merom lines (referred to as Napa Refresh), though that line switched to Socket P (Santa Rosa) in 2007. It typically uses the Intel 945PM/945GM chipsets which support up to 667 MHz FSB and the Intel PM965/GM965 which allows 800 MHz FSB support, though the Socket M, PM965/GM965 combination is less common. The "Sossaman" Xeons use the E7520 chipset.

Relation to other sockets
Socket M is pin-compatible with desktop socket mPGA478A but it is not electrically compatible. Socket M is not pin-compatible with the older desktop Socket 478 (mPGA478B) or the newer mobile Socket P (mPGA478MN) by location of one pin; it is also incompatible with most versions of the older mobile Socket 479. Pentium III-M processors designed for the first version of Socket 479 will physically fit into a Socket M, but are electrically incompatible with it. Although conflicting information has been published, no 45 nm Penryn processors have been released for Socket M.

See also
 List of Intel microprocessors

References

Intel CPU sockets